The 3rd New Jersey Regiment was raised on January 1, 1776, at Elizabethtown, New Jersey for service with the Continental Army. The regiment saw action at the Battle of Valcour Island, New York Campaign, Battle of Brandywine, Battle of Germantown, Battle of Monmouth, Sullivan Expedition and the Battle of Springfield. The regiment was disbanded on January 1, 1781, at Pompton, New Jersey.

One of the captains of this regiment was Jonathan Dayton, the youngest signatory of the United States Constitution.

External links
Bibliography of the Continental Army in New Jersey compiled by the United States Army Center of Military History

3rd New Jersey Regiment
Military units and formations established in 1776
1776 establishments in New Jersey
1781 disestablishments in North America
Military units and formations disestablished in 1781